Marion Miller (16 October 1912 – 7 September 2005) was a Canadian alpine skier. She competed in the women's combined event at the 1936 Winter Olympics.

References

1912 births
2005 deaths
Canadian female alpine skiers
Olympic alpine skiers of Canada
Alpine skiers at the 1936 Winter Olympics
People from Lunenburg County, Nova Scotia